The People's Union for the Liberation of Guadeloupe (UPLG) is a far-left political party in the French overseas department of Guadeloupe. The UPLG advocates for the independence of the Guadeloupe from France.

References 

Political parties in Guadeloupe
Far-left political parties